André Krogsæter (born 12 May 1961), nicknamed "Kråka", is a Norwegian football player. He was born in Oslo. He played for the club Lillestrøm, and also for the Norwegian national team. He competed at the 1984 Summer Olympics in Los Angeles.

He became Norwegian champion with the club Lillestrøm in 1981 and 1985. In 1985, he scored all four goals for Lillestrøm in the final against Vålerengen.

References

External links 
 

1961 births
Living people
Footballers from Oslo
Norwegian footballers
Norway international footballers
Footballers at the 1984 Summer Olympics
Olympic footballers of Norway
Association football forwards
Lillestrøm SK players
Frigg Oslo FK players